Himatismenida is an Amoebozoa order, in the class Discosea, along with Glycostylida and Dermamoebida. It contains species such as Cochliopodium gallicum.

References

Amoebozoa orders
Discosea